Martin Laurent Picandet (born 22 September 1976), better known by his stage name Martin Solveig, is a French DJ, singer, songwriter and record producer. He hosts a weekly radio show called C'est La Vie on radio stations worldwide, including Radio FG in his homeland.

He has been active since 1994. Solveig manages his own label called Mixture Stereophonic and was ranked number 29 in the 2011 DJ Mag Top 100 DJs. He has collaborated with, among others, Ina Wroldsen, David Guetta, Jax Jones (together under the alias Europa), Laidback Luke, Dragonette, Kele of Bloc Party and Madonna.

Early life
Solveig was born in Paris. As a child, he joined the choir of The Paris Boys Choir also known in France as Les petits chanteurs de Sainte-Croix de Neuilly, where he had a classical music training and became soprano soloist under the direction of François Polgár. At the age of 18, he became a DJ and then started to work in famous Parisian nightclubs: L'Enfer, Le Queen, Les Bains Douches.

Career

2002–2007: Sur la Terre and Hedonist
On 17 June 2002, Solveig released his debut studio album Sur la Terre; the album failed to chart. The album includes the singles "Madan", "Rocking Music" and "I'm a Good Man". On 12 September 2005, he released his second studio album Hedonist; this peaked at number 43 on the French Albums Chart. The album includes the singles "Everybody", "Jealousy", "Something Better" and "Rejection".

2008–2009: C'est la Vie

On 2 June 2008, Solveig released his third studio album C'est la Vie. The album peaked at number 16 on the French Albums Chart. "C'est la Vie" was released as the lead single from the album on 21 January 2008. "I Want You" was released as the second single from the album on 15 September 2008. "One 2.3 Four" was released as the third single from the album on 22 December 2008. "Boys & Girls" was released as the fourth single from the album on 28 September 2009.

2010–2012: Smash
On 6 September 2010, he released the single "Hello" with Dragonette as the lead single from his fifth studio album. It is Solveig's most successful single to date, peaking at number one in Austria, Belgium (Flanders), Czech Republic and the Netherlands, while charting within the top 10 in ten other countries. The song also peaked at number 13 on the UK Singles Chart. "Ready 2 Go" was released as the second single from the album on 28 March 2011. He released his fifth studio album Smash on 6 June 2011, peaking at number 18 on the French Albums Chart. In 2011, Solveig was officially named as one of the producers for Madonna's new studio album, MDNA. On 24 October 2011, "Big in Japan" was released as the third single from the album. On 2 April 2012, "The Night Out" was released as the fourth single from the album. Solveig was also made the in house DJ for the 2012 MTV Movie Awards where he paid homage to the classic themes from movies such as Pulp Fiction.

2013–present
On 28 May 2013, Solveig released the single "Hey Now" with The Cataracs featuring vocals from Kyle, peaking at number 55 on the French Singles Chart. The song has also charted in Belgium, Germany and Ireland. On 6 January 2014, he released the single "Blow" with Laidback Luke. The song charted in Belgium. On 23 February 2015, he released the single "Intoxicated" with GTA. The song has peaked at number 15 on the French Singles Chart. On 6 July 2015, he released the single "+1" featuring vocals from Sam White. In 2016, Solveig released the single "Do It Right" with Australian singer Tkay Maidza. In 2017, while leaving Spinnin', Solveig released the single "All Stars" with Finnish singer Alma.

Controversies

In December 2018, Solveig received criticism when he asked the first ever winner of the Ballon d'Or Féminin, Ada Hegerberg, to twerk on stage at the awards ceremony. UEFA President Aleksander Čeferin called him an "idiot that doesn't know how to behave" and added that he "will never again host such an event". Solveig issued a public apology "to anyone who may have been offended" and said it was a joke and that Hegerberg did not consider it sexual harassment.

DJ Mag
 2007: No. 72 
 2008: No. 52 
 2009: No. 47 
 2010: No. 55 
 2011: No. 29 
 2012: No. 48 
 2013: No. 77 
 2014: Unlisted
 2015: Unlisted
 2016: No. 98
 2017: Unlisted

Discography

Studio albums
 Sur la terre (2002)
 Hedonist (2005)
 C'est la Vie (2008)
 Smash (2011)

References

External links

 TwistedHouse.com Martin Solveig Interview

 Martin Solveig Interview (Ibiza, Spain) in 2006
 Martin Solveig biography
 Top 40 charts record for Martin Solveig
 Martin Solveig İstanbul

1976 births
Living people
21st-century French male musicians
21st-century French singers
Big Beat Records (American record label) artists
Club DJs
Electro house musicians
Electronic dance music DJs
French dance musicians
French DJs
French electronic musicians
French house musicians
French male singers
French songwriters
Future house musicians
Juno Award for Dance Recording of the Year winners
Mercury Records artists
Ministry of Sound artists
Musicians from Paris
People from Neuilly-sur-Seine
Singers from Paris
Spinnin' Records artists